Rochelle Oliver (born April 15, 1937) is an American acting coach and former actress.

Career 
Oliver studied acting with Uta Hagen. Her stage appearances include The Brothers Karamazov, The Cave Dwellers, The Diary of Anne Frank and Toys in the Attic, the latter of which earned her a Clarence Derwent Award in 1960.

In 1958, she appeared on television in the "Saw My Baby There" episode of Naked City. In 1963, she played the part of Jean Lowell in the episode "The Noose" from The Defenders. In 1970, she had a recurring role as Barbara Lamont in the series The Best of Everything. In 1976, she played the part of Dr. Marsha in Paul Mazursky's Next Stop, Greenwich Village. From 1993 to 2003, she appeared as Judge Grace Larkin in Law & Order.

Oliver has been teaching acting since the 1970s. She is currently on the faculty of HB Studio in New York City.

Personal life 
Oliver is Jewish. In 1959, she married actor James Patteron, with whom she had a son. They remained together until his death in 1972. In 1997, Oliver married actor Fritz Weaver. They remained together until Weaver's death in 2016.

Filmography

References

External links 
 

1937 births
20th-century American actresses
Actresses from New York City
American acting coaches
American film actresses
American stage actresses
American television actresses
Jewish American actresses
Living people
21st-century American Jews
21st-century American women